Jorge David Aguirre Wardi (born 2 January 1962) is a retired Argentinean heavyweight judoka. Between 1980 and 1994 he won six medals at the Pan American Judo Championships, including a gold medal in 1994. He also won a bronze medal at the 1991 Pan American Games and competed at the 1992 Summer Olympics.

References

External links
 

1962 births
Living people
Olympic judoka of Argentina
Judoka at the 1992 Summer Olympics
Pan American Games bronze medalists for Argentina
Argentine male judoka
Pan American Games medalists in judo
Judoka at the 1991 Pan American Games
Medalists at the 1991 Pan American Games